Robert Daws (born 4 May 1959) is an English actor, and crime fiction author. He is best known for his television roles, including Tuppy Glossop in Jeeves and Wooster (1990-93), gruff cricketer Roger Dervish in the comedy Outside Edge (1994-96), mini-cab firm owner Sam in the sitcom Roger Roger (1996-2003), and East Yorkshire GP Dr Gordon Ormerod in the period medical drama The Royal (2003-11).

Acting career
Daws was trained at RADA. Daws appeared in the 1982 stage play On Your Way, Riley! with Brian Murphy and Maureen Lipman. He played Tuppy Glossop in the early 1990s ITV version of Jeeves and Wooster. He played pompous cricket captain Roger Dervish alongside Brenda Blethyn in the award-winning ITV comedy-drama Outside Edge 1994–96, for which he was nominated for Best Comedy Actor at the British Comedy Awards. He has also appeared in a number of one-off dramas including the 1997 BBC drama, The Missing Postman, Sword of Honour (Channel 4), Take a Girl Like You (BBC), Mystery of Men (BBC) and in 1996 he starred in a pilot of what would become the long-running series Roger Roger, a comedy-drama which ran until 2003. Daws starred as Sam Mountjoy, the co-owner of Cresta Cabs. Daws also appeared as Ernie Rayner in the three-part prequel to Only Fools and Horses, Rock and Chips (BBC).

He played Mike Spicer in Midsomer Murders "Hidden Depths" (2005), and Hamish Rafferty in "The Curse of the Ninth" (2017).

Daws plays the trumpet, as evidenced when in 1994 he appeared as a guest in the final episode of the BBC comedy series A Bit of Fry and Laurie (series four) and played over the credits, accompanied by Hugh Laurie on the piano.

Daws appeared as Dr. Gordon Ormerod in the long-running ITV drama series The Royal, the last scenes of which showed Ormerod fighting for his life after an attack at the hospital.

Robert Daws played a recurring role in Robin of Sherwood as King John's herald, Hubert de Guiscarde in the episodes "The Greatest Enemy" and "The Sheriff of Nottingham".

In November and December 2009, he appeared in Public Property by Sam Peter Jackson at the Trafalgar Studios.

In May and June 2010, he appeared in Coronation Street as Gail McIntyre's barrister as part of her murder trial storyline where she was wrongly accused of murdering husband Joe McIntyre.

From July 2010 to 11 September 2010, Daws appeared as Dr Watson in The Secret of Sherlock Holmes at the Duchess Theatre. In this production, Sherlock Holmes was played by Peter Egan. Daws also appeared as Jim Hacker in the West End production of Yes, Prime Minister and the national tour of Blackbird by David Harrower, for which he was nominated for Best Actor in the Manchester Evening News Drama Awards. He also appeared in the first Classic Comedy Company productions of Ten Times Table and How the Other Half Loves, by Alan Aykbourn. Also, Michael Frayn's Alarms and Excursions.

He appeared as Charles Pooter in a new adaptation of Diary of a Nobody and as John Carlisle, in an episode of New Tricks (Series 8, episode 9) which was first shown on BBC1 on 29 August 2011. He played Gavin Dibbs the husband of the new GP in Port Wenn in an episode of Doc Martin (Series 5, episode 1) first shown on ITV on 12 September 2011.

He played Jack Whitehall's father in Jack's Sky Christmas Cracker, and portrays Mayor Len Winkler in Ben Elton's comedy series, The Wright Way, for BBC One.

He portrayed Arthur Lowe (June 2019) on BBC Radio 4, in Dear Arthur, Love John and Ronnie Barker in Goodnight from Him and John Betjeman in New Fame. New Love (BBC Radio 4). He also co-created the BBC Radio detective series Trueman and Riley and played Trueman in all three series.

In 2014, he began filming Poldark as Dr Thomas Choake. (BBC 2015-2019)

In 2016, he appeared in the BBC TV series Father Brown as Robert Twyman, and as John Green in Death in Paradise. He also starred as Professor James Cheeseman in the horror movie The Unfolding. He also appeared in Agatha Raisin “Love from Hell” as Ted Huxley (2019). Also as psychotic drug baron Shank, in Sky's black comedy series, Sick Note (2019)

He stars as Peter Weiss in the movie The Piper which premieres in Oct 2021, and P.G. Wodehouse in William Humble's Wodehouse In Wonderland.

Literary career
Daws worked with best-selling mystery writer Adam Croft on a radio-play adaptation of Croft's 2011 book, Exit Stage Left, which was released in 2012 with Daws playing the lead character Kempston Hardwick. Daws and Croft present the crime fiction podcast 'Partners In Crime'.

Daws' first crime novella, The Rock, was published in July 2012. This was followed in September 2016 with a sequel, The Poisoned Rock. A third volume of the series, The Killing Rock, was published in 2020.

Personal life
Daws was born in Leigh-on-Sea, Essex.

Since February 2003 he has been married to Amy Robbins (his co-star in The Royal, who played Dr. Jill Weatherill, who later became his screen wife). They have two daughters, Elizabeth and May, and a son, Benjamin. They live in Ampthill, Bedfordshire, where Robert compered the town's first Proms in June 2009 and helped to set up the Ampthill Literary Festival.

Filmography

Film

Television

Select stage credits

Select audio credits

Bibliography
The Rock (2012)
The Poisoned Rock (2016)
The Killing Rock (2020)

References

External links

1959 births
Living people
English male film actors
English male television actors
People from Ampthill
English crime fiction writers